Snow Hill, Snowhill, or Snowshill may refer to:

Antarctica and Australia
 Snow Hill Island, Antarctica, where the Swedish Antarctic Expedition explorers over-wintered in 1902
 Snow Hill, a peak near Avoca, Tasmania

UK
 Birmingham Snow Hill railway station
 Snow Hill Lines, the lines running through the station.
 Snow Hill Tunnel (Birmingham), railway tunnel running into the station.
 Snowhill, the development project adjacent to the station
 Snow Hill, London, previously an area and now a short street off Holborn Viaduct in the Smithfield area of the City of London.
 Snow Hill Tunnel (London), railway tunnel in the City of London.
 Snow Hill railway station (London) (closed in 1916), City of London.
 Snowshill, a village in the Cotswolds of Gloucestershire
 Snow Hill in Windsor Great Park in Berkshire, at the southern end of the Long Walk.

USA
 Snow Hill, Alabama, an unincorporated community 
 Snow Hill in Ashford, Connecticut, the highest point in Windham County, Connecticut
 Snow Hill, Miami County, Indiana
 Snow Hill, Parke County, Indiana
 Snow Hill, Randolph County, Indiana
 Snow Hill (Little Rock, Kentucky), listed on the NRHP in Bourbon County, Kentucky
 Snow Hill, Maryland, a town on Maryland's Eastern Shore, in Worcester County, Maryland
 Snow Hill (Laurel, Maryland), listed on the NRHP in Prince George's County, Maryland
 Snow Hill Site, Port Deposit, Maryland, listed on the NRHP in Cecil County, Maryland 
 Snow Hill, North Carolina, a town in Greene County
Snow Hill Historic District, Snow Hill, North Carolina, listed on the NRHP in Greene County, North Carolina
 Snow Hill, Ohio, an unincorporated community
 Snow Hill, Texas, an unincorporated community in Collin County, Texas
 Snow Hill (Gwaltney Corner, Virginia), listed on the NRHP in Surry County, Virginia
 Snow Hill, West Virginia (disambiguation)